Chak Chak may refer to:
 Chak Chak, Fars, a village in Iran
 Chak Chak, Yazd, a village in Iran
 Shak-shak (AKA Chack-chack), an Antillean musical instrument
 Çäkçäk, a sweet dessert of Tatar, made of honey and pastry